Åna-Sira is a village in southwestern Norway, sitting mostly in Sokndal municipality in Rogaland county, but a small portion lies in Flekkefjord municipality in Agder county.  The village is located at the mouth of the river Sira where it flows south into Åna fjord (hence the name of the village).  The fjord and river form the county border with Rogaland and Agder counties.  The Åna-Sira Bridge crosses the river connecting the two parts of the village.  The village is the southernmost village in Rogaland county.

About 200 people live in Åna-Sira, about two-thirds of the residents living on the north side of the river in Sokndal, and the rest living on the south side of the river.  Åna-Sira Church is located in the Sokndal side of the village.  There is a shrimp factory in the village as well as the Åna-Sira Power Station.

Media gallery

References

Villages in Rogaland
Sokndal
Flekkefjord
Villages in Agder